The Breeders Crown Open Trot is a harness racing event for Standardbred trotters. It is one part of the Breeders Crown annual series of twelve races for both Standardbred trotters and Pacers. The Open Trot for horses age four and older was first run in 1985. It is contested over a distance of one mile. Race organizers have awarded the event to various racetracks across North America. The 2017 race will be held at Hoosier Park in Anderson, Indiana, United States.

Historical race events
In 2010, Pocono Downs became the first venue to host all 12 events on a single night.

North American Locations
Meadowlands Racetrack (Mxx) New Jersey (13)
Mohawk Raceway (Moh) Ontario (5)
Woodbine Racetrack (Wdb) Ontario (4)
Pocono Downs (Pcd) Pennsylvania (2)
Freehold Raceway (Fhl) New Jersey (1)
The Meadows Racetrack (Mea) Pennsylvania (1)
Pompano Park (Ppk) Florida (1)
Freestate Raceway (Fsr) Maryland (1)
Delaware County Fairgrounds racetrack (Dela) (1)
Louisville Downs (Lou) (1)
Sportsmans Park (Spt) (1)
Saratoga Raceway (Stg) (1)

Records
 Most wins by a driver
 6 – John Campbell (1985, 1988, 1989, 1994, 1997, 2008)

 Most wins by a trainer 
 2 – Charles Sylvester  (1988, 1994), Ron Waples (1990, 1992), Jimmy Takter (1998, 2015), Jim Doherty (2002, 2003), Trond Smedshammer (2004, 2006), Brian Sears (2006, 2016), Linda Toscano (2012, 2013)

 Stakes record
 1:51 0/0 – Market Share (2013) & Commander Crowe (2014)

Winners of the Breeders Crown Open Trot

References

Recurring sporting events established in 1985
Harness racing in the United States
Harness racing in Canada   
Breeders Crown
Racing series for horses
Horse races in New York (state)
Horse races in New Jersey
Horse races in Pennsylvania
Horse races in Ohio
Horse races in Florida
Horse races in Kentucky
Horse races in Illinois
Horse races in Ontario